Hippodonta is a genus of diatoms belonging to the family Naviculaceae.

The genus has cosmopolitan distribution.

Species

Species:

Hippodonta abunda 
Hippodonta acus 
Hippodonta acuta

References

Naviculales
Diatom genera